The Portuguese Autonomous Regions of Azores and Madeira held their own Regional Legislative election of 1996 on October 13.

In the Azores, there were 52 seats in the Regional Parliament in dispute, one more than in the previous election, in 1992. The seats were distributed by the 9 islands of the archipelago proportionally to the population of each island.

In Madeira, there were 59 seats in dispute, two more than in the previous election, distributed by the 11 municipalities of the archipelago proportionally to the population of each municipality.

The Socialist Party won the election in Azores for the first time, gathering 45% of the voting and electing Carlos César to the presidency of the Regional Government, after 20 years of dominance by the Social Democratic Party.

In Madeira, Alberto João Jardim, of the Social Democratic Party kept his dominance over the regional political panorama, winning the election with an absolute majority of 57%, the 6th consecutive absolute majority since the very first election in 1976.

The election in Azores

The winner of the election was the Socialist Party, that for the first time, achieved the majority of the voting, receiving, however, the same number of MPs as the Social Democratic Party. It was an historical victory for the socialists, after 20 years of dominance by the right-wing Social Democratic Party. Carlos Manuel Martins do Vale César became the new president of the Regional Government, succeeding to Alberto Romão Madruga da Costa.

The Democratic Alliance of Azores lost its single MP and the People's Party, that did not participated in the last election, managed to elect 3 MPs after receiving more than 7% of the voting.

On the left, the Unitary Democratic Coalition, led by the Portuguese Communist Party re-elected its MP, after winning the election in the island of Flores. The People's Democratic Union did not manage to elect a single MP.

Summary of votes and seats

|-
! rowspan="2" colspan=2 style="background-color:#E9E9E9" align=left|Parties
! rowspan="2" style="background-color:#E9E9E9" align=right|Votes
! rowspan="2" style="background-color:#E9E9E9" align=right|%
! rowspan="2" style="background-color:#E9E9E9" align=right|±pp swing
! colspan="5" style="background-color:#E9E9E9" align="center"|MPs
! rowspan="2" colspan=5 style="background-color:#E9E9E9" align=right|MPs %/votes %
|- style="background-color:#E9E9E9"
! align="center"|1992
! align="center"|1996
! style="background-color:#E9E9E9" align=right|±
! style="background-color:#E9E9E9" align=right|%
! style="background-color:#E9E9E9" align=right|±
|-
| 
|51,906||45.82||9.4||21||24||3||46.15||5.0||1.01
|-
| 
|46,449||41.00||12.6||28||24||4||46.15||8.7||1.13
|-
| 
|8,346||7.37||—||1||3||2||5.77||3.8||0.78
|-
| 
|3,940||3.48||1.2||1||1||0||1.92||0.1||0.55
|-
|style="width: 10px" bgcolor=#E2062C align="center" | 
|align=left|People's Democratic Union
|983||0.87||—||—||0||—||0.00||—||0.0
|-
| 
|340||0.30||1.1||0||0||0||0.00||0.0||0.0
|-
|colspan=2 align=left style="background-color:#E9E9E9"|Total valid
|width="50" align="right" style="background-color:#E9E9E9"|111,964
|width="40" align="right" style="background-color:#E9E9E9"|98.83
|width="40" align="right" style="background-color:#E9E9E9"|0.5
|width="40" align="right" style="background-color:#E9E9E9"|51
|width="40" align="right" style="background-color:#E9E9E9"|52
|width="40" align="right" style="background-color:#E9E9E9"|1
|width="40" align="right" style="background-color:#E9E9E9"|100.00
|width="40" align="right" style="background-color:#E9E9E9"|0.0
|width="40" align="right" style="background-color:#E9E9E9"|—
|-
|colspan=2|Blank ballots
|705||0.62||0.1||colspan=6 rowspan=3|
|-
|colspan=2|Invalid ballots
|624||0.55||0.6
|-
|colspan=2 align=left style="background-color:#E9E9E9"|Total (turnout 59.17%)
|width="50" align="right" style="background-color:#E9E9E9"|113,293
|width="40" align="right" style="background-color:#E9E9E9"|100.00
|width="40" align="right" style="background-color:#E9E9E9"|3.0
|-
| colspan=11 align=left|The People's Party contested the 1992 election in an alliance formed by the People's Party (1 seat) and the People's Monarchist Party (0 seats).
|-
| colspan=11 align=left | Source: Comissão Nacional de Eleições
|}

The election in Madeira

The winner of the election in Madeira was, once more, the Social Democratic Party, and Alberto João Jardim was elected president of the Regional Government with an absolute majority for the 6th consecutive time. The percentage gathered by the social democrats was virtually the same of the previous election, however, due to the populational growth of the region, the number of MPs was increased from 57 to 59, and so, the social democrats gained 2 MPs, achieving a total of 41.

The People's Party lost some of its voters, but still managed to keep the 2 MPs, unlike the National Solidarity Party that lost its single MP.

On the left, the Socialist Party increased the voting by 1% and received one more MP. The Unitary Democratic Coalition, led by the Portuguese Communist Party, increased the voting and the number of MPs, stealing one MP from the People's Democratic Union that elected only 1 MP.

Summary of votes and seats

|-
! rowspan="2" colspan=2 style="background-color:#E9E9E9" align=left|Parties
! rowspan="2" style="background-color:#E9E9E9" align=right|Votes
! rowspan="2" style="background-color:#E9E9E9" align=right|%
! rowspan="2" style="background-color:#E9E9E9" align=right|±pp swing
! colspan="5" style="background-color:#E9E9E9" align="center"|MPs
! rowspan="2" colspan=5 style="background-color:#E9E9E9" align=right|MPs %/votes %
|- style="background-color:#E9E9E9"
! align="center"|1992
! align="center"|1996
! style="background-color:#E9E9E9" align=right|±
! style="background-color:#E9E9E9" align=right|%
! style="background-color:#E9E9E9" align=right|±
|-
| 
|77,365||56.87||0.0||39||41||2||69.49||1.1||1.22
|-
| 
|33,790||24.84||2.3||12||13||1||22.03||0.9||0.89
|-
| 
|9,950||7.31||0.8||2||2||0||3.39||0.1||0.46
|-
| 
|5,495||4.04||1.0||1||2||1||3.39||1.6||0.84
|-
|style="width: 10px" bgcolor=#E2062C align="center" | 
|align=left|People's Democratic Union
|5,485||4.03||0.6||2||1||1||1.69||1.8||0.42
|-
| 
|875||0.64||1.8||1||0||1||0.00||1.8||0.0
|-
| 
|565||0.42||0.2||0||0||0||0.00||0.0||0.0
|-
|colspan=2 align=left style="background-color:#E9E9E9"|Total valid
|width="50" align="right" style="background-color:#E9E9E9"|133,525
|width="40" align="right" style="background-color:#E9E9E9"|98.14
|width="40" align="right" style="background-color:#E9E9E9"|0.1
|width="40" align="right" style="background-color:#E9E9E9"|57
|width="40" align="right" style="background-color:#E9E9E9"|59
|width="40" align="right" style="background-color:#E9E9E9"|2
|width="40" align="right" style="background-color:#E9E9E9"|100.00
|width="40" align="right" style="background-color:#E9E9E9"|0.0
|width="40" align="right" style="background-color:#E9E9E9"|—
|-
|colspan=2|Blank ballots
|991||0.73||0.0||colspan=6 rowspan=3|
|-
|colspan=2|Invalid ballots
|1,534||1.13||0.2
|-
|colspan=2 align=left style="background-color:#E9E9E9"|Total (turnout 65.26%)
|width="50" align="right" style="background-color:#E9E9E9"|136,050
|width="40" align="right" style="background-color:#E9E9E9"|100.00
|width="40" align="right" style="background-color:#E9E9E9"|1.2
|-
| colspan=11 align=left | Source: Comissão Nacional de Eleições
|}

See also

Azores
Madeira

Portugal
1996 in Portugal
1996